Khadim Nagar National Park is a major national park and nature reserve in Bangladesh. The park is located at Sylhet Sadar Upazila, Sylhet District in the North-East region of the country. It is located mainly on the Hills and is surrounded by Kalagool, Bhurjan and Goolni tea estates. 
The British colonial people cleared the land for extensive tea plantations. After 1950 tree plantations of teak, Garjan, Bamboo, Champa, Agar, Akashmoni, Eucalyptus and Acacia Mangium was carried out by Forest Department. The Forest was declared as national park by the Bangladesh government on 13 April 2006 under the Bangladesh wildlife (Preservation) Amendment Act of 1947. The present forest is divided into 6 forest working circles. The forest area has LR plantations- 380 Ha, SR Plantations-10 Ha, Bamboo Plantations-150Ha, Cane plantations-258Ha and Agar Plantations-40ha.

Location
It is located 13 km East of Sylhet town.
The area is much undulating and dissected by streams and hill spurs. The overall appearance of the forest is various patches of artificial plantations of different ages. The park is  10 km in length and 0.50 km in width.

The climate is generally humid and warm. The park enjoys tropical monsoon from June to September every year. The soil is loamy, clay and sandy loam at various places.

Plants and animals

Flora
The general walk in the forest is not easy due to undulating terrain and dense vegetation. About 352 plant species belonging to 81 families have been recorded. Some plant species recorded are Aquilaria malaccensis (Agar), Dipterocarpus turbinatus, Artocarpus chaplasha, Chukrasia tabularis, Toona ciliata, Syzygium grandis, Tectona grandis, and Quercus gomezyiana. The trees are covered with good number of parasites and orchids. Some of the common orchids are Aerides multiflora, Aerides odorata, Dendrobium formosum, and Bulbophyllum lilacinum. Plants species like Vitex peduncularis (Awal), Litsea glutinosa (Menda), Sterculia villosa (Udal) and Dehaasia Kurzii (Modonmast) are under threat due to overexploitation. Some of the threatened plants found in the park are Swintonia floribunda, Aglaonema hookerianum, Aquilaria agallocha, Globbs multiflora, Pterospermum semisaggittatum, Steodnera calocasioides, Pinnaga gracilis, Rauvolfia serpentina, Mangifera sylvatica, Calamus guruba and Cyathea gigantean.

Fauna
The fauna consists of 20 reptile species, 25 Birds species and 26 Mammal species. The majority of animals found are spotted deer. Other animals seen here are Jackals, Mongoose, Monitor lizard.

Human settlement
There are scanty human habitation inside the National park area.

See also

 List of protected areas of Bangladesh

References

National parks of Bangladesh
Forests of Bangladesh